All in Good Time is a comic play by Bill Naughton based on his 1961 Armchair Theatre television play "Honeymoon Postponed". Originally produced at the Mermaid Theatre in 1963 in London, it subsequently transferred to the Phoenix Theatre, and then to Broadway, where it ran for 44 performances in February and March 1965. The Broadway cast included Donald Wolfit, Marjorie Rhodes and Richard Dysart. It received Tony Award Best Actress and Best Featured Actress nominations for Marjorie Rhodes and Alexandra Berlin.

Plot
Teenage newlyweds living with the groom's parents, have difficulties consummating their marriage.

Original production
The play, directed by Josephine Wilson, opened on 6 March 1963 at Bernard Miles' Mermaid Theatre, London, before transferring to the Phoenix Theatre in the West End.

Arthur Fitton - 	John Pickles
Eddie Taylor - 	Laurie Asprey
Ezra Fitton - 	Bernard Miles
Geoffrey Fitton - 	Edward Petherbridge
Joe Thompson - 	Peter Welch
Leslie Piper - 	Donald Eccles
Liz Piper - 	Maureen Pryor
Lucy Fitton - 	Marjorie Rhodes
Molly Thompson	- Mary Quinn
Uncle Fred - 	John McKelvey
Violet Fitton - 	Lois Daine

Original Broadway production
The play, directed by Donald McWhinnie, opened at the Royale Theatre, New York, on 18 February 1965 and closed on 27 March 1965.

Violet Fitton - Alexandra Berlin 
Liz Piper - Hazel Douglas
Uncle Fred - Richard A. Dysart
Geoffrey Fitton - John Karlen
Eddie Taylor - Terry Lomax  
Arthur Fitton - Brian Murray
Lucy Fitton - Marjorie Rhodes
Joe Thompson - Eugene Roche
Rosalind Ross - Molly Thompson  
Leslie Piper - John Sharp 
Ezra Fitton - Donald Wolfit

Adaptations
The play was adapted for the 1966 film The Family Way.

All in Good Time (2011) shares much of the plot of The Family Way but it features a Hindu couple, and their planned honeymoon destination is Goa, not Majorca.

Notes

External links
 

1963 plays
Broadway plays
West End plays
British plays adapted into films